ν Ceti, Latinized as Nu Ceti, is a binary star system in the equatorial constellation of Cetus. It is visible to the naked eye as a faint point of light with a combined apparent visual magnitude of 4.86. The system is located approximately 340 light years distant from the Sun, based on parallax, and is drifting further away with a radial velocity of 4.8 km/s. Nu Ceti is believed to be part of the Ursa Major stream of co-moving stars.

Consequently, the Chinese name for ν Ceti itself is "the Seventh Star of Circular Celestial Granary", .

The visible component is a G-type giant star, currently on the horizontal branch, with a stellar classification of G8III. In addition to the spectroscopic companion there is a visual companion star which shares a common proper motion with Nu Ceti A, designated component B; an F-type main-sequence star with a class of F7V and a 9.08 apparent visual magnitude located 8.0 arcsec away. It was discovered by Struve.

References

External links
http://server3.wikisky.org/starview?object_type=1&object_id=1566
http://www.alcyone.de/SIT/bsc/HR0754.html

F-type main-sequence stars
Cetus, Nu
Horizontal-branch stars
Spectroscopic binaries
Ursa Major Moving Group

Cetus (constellation)
Cetus, Nu
Durchmusterung objects
Ceti, 78
016161
012093
0754